The Black Metropolis–Bronzeville District is a historic African American district in the Bronzeville neighborhood of the Douglas community area on the South Side of Chicago, Illinois.

The neighborhood encompasses the land between the Dan Ryan Expressway to the west, Martin Luther King Jr. Drive to the east, 31st Street to the north, and Pershing Road (39th street) to the south.

The Bronzeville–Black Metropolis National Heritage Area was established in the National Heritage Area Act in 2022. The National Heritage Area will help preserve more than 200 locations in the neighborhood between 18th and 71st Streets.

Description
The historic district includes nine structures that were accorded the Chicago Landmark designation on September 9, 1998. These buildings are:
 Overton Hygienic Building
 Chicago Bee Building
 Wabash Avenue YMCA
 Chicago Defender Building
 Unity Hall
 Eighth Regiment Armory
 Sunset Cafe
 Victory Monument
 Supreme Life Building.

Six of the nine were already individually listed on the National Register of Historic Places−NRHP as a multiple property submission, on 30 April 30, 1986. These are the Overton Hygienic Building, Chicago Bee Building, Wabash Avenue YMCA, Unity Hall, Eighth Regiment Armory, and Victory Monument.  However, the Black Metropolis–Bronzeville District is not an NRHP-listed historic district.

The South Side Community Art Center is also now a designated Chicago Landmark in the district.

See also
Black Metropolis
Bronzeville (Douglas, Chicago)
National Register of Historic Places listings in South Side Chicago
Pekin Theatre

Notes

External links

City of Chicago: Official Douglas Community Map

Historic districts in Chicago
Douglas, Chicago
African-American history in Chicago
Chicago Landmarks